Route 165 (locally known as Bishop Grandin Boulevard) is a highway in Winnipeg, Manitoba.  Currently the route is an at-grade expressway running from an interchange with Kenaston Boulevard (Route 90) to Lagimodiere Boulevard (PTH 59 / Route 20). The route runs through the districts of Fort Garry, St. Vital, and St. Boniface.

History 
Bishop Grandin Boulevard first opened to traffic from Lagimodiere Boulevard (PTH 59 / Route 20) to Pembina Highway (Route 42) in 1978, with a westerly extension to Route 80 (Waverley Street) opening in 1990, as well as a second expansion in 1998 expanding from waverley to Route 90. 

In the wake of the 2021 discovery of unmarked burial sites at the former Kamloops Indian Residential School in BC, there have been calls to change the name of the roadway, which bears the name of Vital-Justin Grandin—who is thought to be one of the architects of the residential school system. On June 11, Winnipeg mayor Brian Bowman announced that he would introduce a motion calling for the name of Bishop Grandin Boulevard to be changed.

Major intersections
From west to east:

See also

References

165
Winnipeg 165
St. Vital, Winnipeg
Fort Garry, Winnipeg
Saint Boniface, Winnipeg